Eilema fasciculosa is a moth of the subfamily Arctiinae. It is found on Borneo, Peninsular Malaysia and Bali. The habitat consists of lowland forests, particularly alluvial forests.

References

fasciculosa